Misaeng (lit. "An incomplete life") is a South Korean manhwa series written and illustrated by Yoon Tae-ho. This webtoon was released on internet portal Daum from 2012 to 2013, then the first volume in print was published on September 15, 2012. It was adapted into a TV series of the same name in 2014.

References

External links
 Misaeng official website on Daum 

Manhwa titles
2012 webtoon debuts
South Korean webtoons
Comics adapted into television series
2010s webtoons
2013 comics endings
Webtoons in print
Drama webtoons